Slang for US Coast Guard. Used in jest due to typical roles and missions being near shore versus deep water.

The term has been used as a synonym for:
 US Coast Guard - in contrast with the US Navy
 US Coast Guard Reserve and US Coast Guard Auxiliary - as reserves for the US Coast Guard
 Sea Scouts - in contrast with merchant sailors 
 Youth Cadet Corps - as a junior version of the corresponding Navy

References

Nicknames of military personnel
Pejorative terms for people
Stereotypes